USAV CW3 Harold C. Clinger (LSV-2) is a General Frank S. Besson Jr.-class roll-on/roll-off of US Army.

Design 

Named in honor of Gen. Frank S. Besson Jr., former Chief of Transportation, U.S. Army, these ships have bow and stern ramps and the ability to beach themselves, giving them the ability to discharge 900 short tons of vehicles and cargo over the shore in as little as four feet of water, or 2,000 short tons as an intra-theater line haul roll-on/roll-off cargo ship. The vessel's cargo deck is designed to handle any vehicle in the US Army inventory and can carry up to 15 M1 Abrams main battle tanks or 82 ISO standard containers.

Construction and career 
She was acquired by the US Army on 21 June 2006 and commissioned in 1988 into the  489th Transportation Detachment, United States Army Reserve.

During RIMPAC 2014, on July 2nd, she conducted the first of eight surface lifts between Kaneohe Bay and Kawaihae Harbor in support of 3rd Marines. She would later also partner with 25th Infantry Division's 25th Combat Aviation Brigade, for casualty evacuation operations and a shipboard aerial resupply with the Royal New Zealand Navy.

Gallery

References

External links 
 Navsource – Photo Gallery
 Frank S Besson Class LSV Logistic Support Vessel
 LSVs at globalsecurity.org
 Photo gallery: Family tour aboard the LSV-7 Kuroda | The Honolulu Advertiser
 LSV-8 USAV MG Roberts Smalls – a set on Flickr
 Army Commissions Vessel Named after African-American Civil War Hero, S.C. Statesman
 Robert Smalls Official Website

Ships built in the United States
1988 ships
General Frank S. Besson-class support vessels